Histoire des sciences médicales is a French academic journal established in 1967. It covers the fields of history of medicine and science. It is the official journal of the Société Française d'Histoire de la Médecine. It is abstracted and indexed in MEDLINE/PubMed and FRANCIS.

External links
 

History of medicine journals
Publications established in 1967
French-language journals